Penhurst is a village and civil parish, sharing a parish council with neighbouring Ashburnham, in the Rother district of East Sussex, England. It is located on the Weald, 4 miles (7km) west of Battle. The parish touches Ashburnham, Battle, Brightling and Catsfield. Penhurst shares a parish council with Ashburnham. 

The parish has few residents, according to the 2001 census Penhurst has just 52 inhabitants.

History 
The name "Penhurst" means 'Pena's wooded hill'. Penhurst was recorded in the Domesday Book as Penehest.
In 1086, Penhurst was in the hundred of Hailesaltede; the Abbey of Battle was its tenant-in-chief. The two parishes, neither of which has many dwellings, were originally united in 1810.

Landmarks 
There are 14 listed buildings in Penhurst.

Penhurst Manor is now a Christian retreat centre and is used much in the support of missionaries from overseas.

The 14th century parish church is dedicated to St Michael the Archangel. The actor Harry H Corbett (1925-1982) lies buried in the churchyard.

Governance
At a local level, Penhurst and neighbouring Ashburnham have been governed by a joint parish council, The Parish Council of Ashburnham with Penhurst, since a Grouping Order was made in 1954. The parish council is made up of seven councillors, split into two wards: five councillors from Ashburnham ward and two from Penhurst ward. At the May 2019 election the Penhurst ward was uncontested. Since then two councillors were been co-opted to the Penhurst ward's two vacancies.

Rother District Council provides the next level of government. Ashburnham and Penhurst are within the Crowhurst ward, along with the parishes of Catsfield, Crowhurst, and part of Battle. In the May 2007 election Crowhurst ward was won by the Conservative candidate.

East Sussex County Council is the top tier of local government. Ashburnham with Penhurst falls within the Battle and Crowhurst ward. Kathryn Margaret Field, Liberal Democrat, was elected in the May 2005 election with 48.8% of the vote.

The UK Parliament constituency for Ashburnham and Penhurst is Bexhill and Battle.

Prior to Brexit in 2020, the villages were part of the South East England constituency in the European Parliament.

References

External links
Parish Council and community website
Notes on the parish

Villages in East Sussex
Civil parishes in East Sussex
Rother District